Badminton was inducted at the Youth Olympic Games at the inaugural edition in 2010. The program included two competitions: Boys' singles and Girls' singles. The 2014 edition added a Mixed Doubles event. Players from different National Olympic Committees are allowed to participate in doubles events.

Medal table
As of the 2018 Summer Youth Olympics.

Results

Boys' singles

Girls' singles

Mixed

Participating nations

See also
Badminton at the Summer Olympics

References
 badminton.de

External links
Youth Olympic Games

 
Youth Olympics
Badminton
Olympic